Dana Ellis (born December 7, 1979) is a Canadian former pole vaulter.

At the 2004 Summer Olympics, Ellis finished in a four-way tie for sixth place in the women's pole vault event. Her personal best is 4.52 metres, achieved in August 2007 in California. After her athletic career, she attended medical school at Tulane University in New Orleans, Louisiana.

•	7th ranked pole vaulter in the world in 2005/2006
•	Indoor and Outdoor Canadian National Record Holder in the Women's pole vault between 2000 and 
2008
•	6th place at the 2002 Commonwealth Games
•	5th place at the 2003 Pan American Games 
•	1st place at the 2004 Canadian National Track and Field Championships
•	6th place at the 2004 Olympic Games 
•	2004 Canadian Field Athlete of the Year
•	1st place at the 2005 Canadian National Track and Field Championships and new Canadian Record (14'10''/ 4.51m)
•	6th place at the 2005 World Championships
•	5th place at the 2005 IAAF World Athletic Grand Prix Final
•	4th place at the 2006 Commonwealth Games
•	New Canadian Record (4.52m) August 18, 2007
•	Winner of the 2008 Grand Prix in Osaka, Japan May 10, 2008

Notable Achievements

References

External links
 
 
 
 
 
 
 

1979 births
Living people
Canadian female pole vaulters
Athletes (track and field) at the 2004 Summer Olympics
Olympic track and field athletes of Canada
Sportspeople from Kitchener, Ontario
Track and field athletes from Ontario
Athletes (track and field) at the 2002 Commonwealth Games
Athletes (track and field) at the 2006 Commonwealth Games
Athletes (track and field) at the 2003 Pan American Games
Commonwealth Games competitors for Canada
Pan American Games track and field athletes for Canada
World Athletics Championships athletes for Canada